Legends is an album by saxophonist/composer Benny Carter recorded in 1992 and released by the MusicMasters label.

Reception

AllMusic reviewer Scott Yanow stated "The great altoist Benny Carter is in typically remarkable form at age 85 with a quartet, on five duets with pianist Hank Jones, and on three selections with the truly remarkable trumpeter Doc Cheatham (87 years old at the time). ... there is not a weak track on this classic disc. This set would be recommended even if Carter were 55 rather than 85; the music is timeless and often glorious".

Track listing
All compositions by Benny Carter except where noted
 "The More I See You" (Harry Warren, Mack Gordon) – 6:46	
 "I Was Wrong" – 6:50
 "Wonderland" – 6:26
 "Blues in My Heart" – 10:52
 "You Are" – 4:44
 "People Time" – 3:28
 "No Greater Love" (Isham Jones, Marty Symes) – 6:32
 "Sunset Glow" – 3:21
 "The Little Things That Mean So Much" (Teddy Wilson, Harold Adamson) – 6:33
 "The Legend" – 5:06
 "Honeysuckle Rose" (Fats Waller, Andy Razaf) – 7:59

Personnel 
Benny Carter – alto saxophone
Doc Cheatham – trumpet (tracks 4, 9 & 11)
Chris Neville (tracks 9 & 11), Hank Jones (tracks 1-8 & 10) – piano
Christian McBride – bass (tracks 1, 2, 4, 7, 9 & 11)
Lewis Nash – drums (tracks 1, 2, 4, 7, 9 & 11)

References 

1993 albums
Benny Carter albums
Hank Jones albums
MusicMasters Records albums